The Capital Hoops Classic is a Canadian rivalry basketball series between the University of Ottawa Gee-Gees and Carleton University Ravens sponsored by bank holding company MBNA. The series, featuring both the men's and women's teams, was held at the Canadian Tire Centre (known until 2013 as Scotiabank Place) from 2007 to 2019 until moving to TD Place Arena in 2020. Since 2015, the games traditionally occur on the first Friday in February. 

Both schools are located in the city of Ottawa; Ottawa is older of the two and is located in the downtown Sandy Hill neighbourhood of the city, while Carleton sits between Old Ottawa South and Dow's Lake. Both teams compete in the East division of Ontario University Athletics in U Sports, and frequently finish near the top of the league table.

History
On January 23, 2007, the two men's basketball teams faced off at Scotiabank Place in front of nearly 9,720 spectators, which was a record crowd for a regular season basketball game in U Sports (then known as Canadian Interuniversity Sport). The Ottawa Gee-Gees won the inaugural event 64–62. This event, now known as the Capital Hoops Classic, has been expanded to include the women's teams as well, with the Classic featuring a doubleheader of both teams.

The January 28, 2009 edition of the game broke the 2007 record with 10,523 fans attending the two games, with both of Carleton's teams posting victories over Ottawa.

In the 2013–14 season the teams faced each other both in the provincial and national finals, with Ottawa winning the OUA championship and Carleton winning the national title.

The 2015 matchup set a new record attendance at 10,780 and was the first time in the series where the Gee-Gees Men's team were the top-ranked team in the CIS, with the Ravens holding second. The Gee-Gees defeated the Ravens in an earlier game; the inaugural "Bytown Battle" which took place at the U of O's Montpetit Hall. However, while their women won 46–40, the Gee-Gees men were unable to defeat the Ravens in the rivalry series, falling 79–66.

The 2021 edition of the games were not played, and the 2022 games were played at Carleton University, due to the COVID-19 pandemic.

Game results

Men's

Women's

See also
 Panda Game
 Colonel By Classic

References

College sports rivalries in Canada
Ottawa Gee-Gees
Carleton Ravens basketball
2007 establishments in Ontario
Carleton University
University of Ottawa
U Sports basketball